In chemical kinetics, the Aquilanti–Mundim deformed Arrhenius model is a generalization of the standard Arrhenius law.

Overview 

Arrhenius plots, which are used to represent the effects of temperature on the rates of chemical and biophysical processes and on various transport phenomena in materials science, may exhibit deviations from linearity. Account of curvature is provided here by a formula, which involves a deformation of the exponential function, of the kind recently encountered in treatments of non-extensivity in statistical mechanics.

Theoretical model 

Svante Arrhenius (1889) equation is often used to characterize the effect of temperature on the rates of chemical reactions. The Arrhenius formula gave a simple and powerful law, which in a vast generality of cases describes the dependence on absolute temperature   of the rate constant as following,

                    (1)
 
where    is the absolute temperature,  is the gas constant and the factor   varies only slightly with temperature. The meaning attached to the energy of activation   is as the minimum energy, which molecules need have to overcome the threshold to reaction. Therefore, the year 1889 can be considered as the birth date of reactive dynamics as the study of the motion of atoms and molecules in a reactive event. Eq. (1) was motivated by the 1884 discovery by van't Hoff   of the exponential dependence from the temperature of the equilibrium constants for most reactions: Eq.(1), when used for both a reaction and its inverse, agrees with van't Hoff's equation interpreting chemical equilibrium as dynamical at the microscopic level. In case of a single rate-limited thermally activated process, an Arrhenius plot gives a straight line, from which the activation energy and the pre-exponential factor can both be determined.

However, advances in experimental and theoretical methods have revealed the existence of deviation from Arrhenius behavior (Fig.1).

To overcome this problem, Aquilanti and Mundim proposed (2010) a generalized Arrhenius law based on algebraic deformation of the usual exponential function. Starting from the Euler exponential definition given by,
                 (2)
defining the deformed exponential function as,

                              (3)

At the limit   the d-exponential function, coincides with the usual exponential according to the well-known limit due to Euler, that is,

                                   (4)

This definition was first used in thermodynamics and statistical mechanics by Landau. In the most recent scientific literature, there is a variety of deformed algebras with applications in different areas of science. Considering the d-exponential function, we introduce the deformed reaction rate coefficient, in the following way,

                        (5)

and at the limit   the usual Arrhenius reaction law is recovered (Figs.1 and 1a).  is pre-exponential factor.

                       (6)

The logarithm of the reaction rate coefficient against reciprocal temperature shows a curvature, rather than the straight-line behavior described by the usual Arrhenius law (Figs.1 and 1a).

In Tolman’s definition the barrier or activation energy is a phenomenological quantity defined in terms of the slope of an Arrhenius law; it is usually assumed to be independent of absolute temperature (T), requires only local equilibrium and in general is given by

                                      (7)

To generalize Tolman´s definition, in the case chemical reactions, we assume that the barrier or activation energy is a function of the temperature given by the following differential equation,

  or   →     (8)

where   (constant) at limit    and the usual activation energy law is recovered as a constant. Noticeably, on the contrary of the usual Arrhenius case, the barrier or activation energy is temperature dependent and   has different concavities depending on the value of the d parameter (see Figs.1 and 1a). Thus, a positive convexity means that  decreases with increasing temperature. This general result is explained by a new Tolman-like interpretation of the activation energy through Eq.(8).

In the recent literature, it is possible to find different applications to verify the applicability of this new chemical reaction formalism

Apparent Reciprocal Activation Energy or Transitivity 
  can be considered as temperature dependent. It was postulated as the basic expansion the reciprocal-activation reciprocal-temperature relationship, for which can provide a formal mathematical justification by Tolman Theorem. (7), the concept to an activation energy represents an energetic obstacle to the progress of the reaction: therefore its reciprocal can be interpreted as a measure of the propensity for the reaction to proceed and defined as the specific transitivity  of the process:
      (9)
This notation emphasizes the fact that in general the transitivity can take a gamma of values, but not including abrupt changes e.g. in the mechanism or in the phases of reactants. If it is admit a Laurent expansion in  a neighbourhood around a reference value, it is possible recover the Eqs. (6) and (8).

What it is call the sub-Arrhenius behaviour would be accounted for traditionally by introducing a tunnelling parameter in the conventional Transition-State-Theory. In the -TST formulation, it is replace the factor  in the TST rate constant by the deformed exponential function, Eq. (3), yielding:

      (10)
In Ref., the significance of the  parameter  and an explicit procedure for its calculation were  proposed, which it is inversely proportional to the square of the barrier height and directly proportional to the square of the frequency for crossing the barrier  at a saddle point in the potential energy surface:

      (11)

Fields of Applications and Related Subjects 
This theory was initially developed for applications in chemical kinetics problems as above discussed, but has since been applied to a wide range of phenomena:

 the characterization of reaction rates in Chemistry,
 Transition State Theory (TST), 
 Astrochemical process, 
 quantum tunneling, 
 stereodynamics stereochemistry of kinetics processes, solid-state diffusive reactions, 
 physical processes in supercooled liquids, 
 carbon nanotubes composite, 
 transport phenomena, 
 anomalous diffusion, 
 Brownian particles moving, 
 transport dynamics in ionic conductors, 
 a continuum approach for modeling gravitational effects on grain settling and shape distortion,
 collision theory, 
 rate theory connecting kinetics to thermodynamics, 
 nonextensive statistical mechanics, 
 different fields of plasma chemical-physics, 
 modelling of high-temperature dark current in multi-quantum well structures from MWIR to VLWI, 
 molecular semiconductor problems, 
 Metallurgy: perspectives on lubricant additive corrosion, 
 Langevin stochastic dynamics, 
 predicting solubility of solids in supercritical solvents, 
 survey on operational perishables (food) quality control and logistics, 
 activation energy’s on biodiesel reaction, 
 flux over population analysis, 
 molecular quantum mechanics, 
 biological activity, 
 drug design, 
 protein folding.
 Motor proteins,
 Microbial growth laws,
 Water dynamics
 Classroom on Motivation and Sociability
 Virial coefficients in chemical reaction
 Diffusion in a binary colloidal mixture
 Claisen–Schmidt condensation
 Thermotherapy
 Landscape topography
 3D-printed powder components
 Glass alloy
 Li-ion Batteries

References

Chemical kinetics